Tobias Moretti (born Tobias Bloéb; 11 July 1959) is an Austrian actor.

Biography
Born in Gries am Brenner, Tyrol, Moretti is the eldest of four brothers, including Thomas, Christoph and fellow actor Gregor Bloéb. Since 1997, he has been married to Julia Moretti (née Wilhem), an oboist. They have three children, Antonia (born August 1998), Lenz Valentino (born February 2000) and Rosa Cäcilia (born February 2011). His professional surname comes from his mother, who is of Italian descent.

Moretti studied composition at the Vienna University of Music and Applied Arts, then went to Munich to train for the stage at the renowned Otto-Falckenberg-Schule. After graduation he was a permanent member of the Bayerisches Staatsschauspiel ensemble (Frank Baumbauer) and played at the Munich Kammerspiele (Dieter Dorn) from 1985 to 1995 where he earned critical praise in a sweeping variety of productions, appearing in Bertolt Brecht's Man is Man, Achternbusch's Der Frosch (The Frog) and playing the lead  in Shakespeare's Troilus and Cressida.

Moretti appeared in the TV series Inspector Rex from 1994 to 1998 as Richard Moser, the main policeman in the murder unit.

Filmography

Wilhelm Busch (1986, TV film), as Young Wilhelm Busch
The Curse (1988), as Mountain rescue service
 (1990, TV miniseries), as Josef 'Joe' Rotter
Der Rausschmeißer (1990), as Harry
Inspector Rex (1994–1998, TV series, 45 episodes), as Richard Moser
Night of Nights (1995, TV film)
Unser Opa ist der Beste (1995, TV film), as Wolfgang Ohr
Workaholic (1996), as Max
 (1997, TV film), as Pastor Joseph Mohr
Die Bernauerin (1997, TV film), as Herzog Albrecht
Ein Herz wird wieder jung (1997), as Paul
 (1997, TV film), as Wolfgang Ohr
Mortal Friends (1998, TV film), as Nico Möller
 (1998, TV film), as Gottfried
 (1998, TV film), as Wolf Pachler
Mia, Liebe meines Lebens (1998, TV miniseries), as Johnny Ryan
Your Best Years (1999, TV film), as Manfred Minke
Shadows (1999, TV film), as Davide Berger
Alphamann (1999, TV series, 1 episode), as Martin Buchmüller
Joseph of Nazareth (1999, TV film), as Joseph
 (1999, TV film), as Joseph
Die Nichte und der Tod (1999, TV film), as Jeff Meltzer
Das Tattoo – Tödliche Zeichen (2000, TV film), as Karl
Trivial Pursuit (2000, TV film), as Paul
 (2001, TV film), as Georg Kufbach
Julius Caesar (2002, TV miniseries), as Gaius Cassius
 (2002, TV film), as Stefan Schuster
Gefährliche Nähe und du ahnst nichts (2002, TV film), as Harry Möllemann
 (2002, TV film), as Andreas Hofer
All Around the Town (2002, TV film), as Billy Hawkins aka Bic
Der Narr und seine Frau heute Abend in Pancomedia (2002, TV film), as Zacharias Werner
 (2003, TV film), as Kooperator
Käthchens Traum (2004, TV film), as Friedrich Wetter Count von Strahl
Jedermann (2004, TV film), as Jedermanns guter Gesell/Teufel
 (2004, TV film), as Stefan Lindman
Speer und Er (Speer and Hitler: The Devil's Architect, 2005, TV miniseries), as Adolf Hitler
König Ottokars Glück und Ende (2006, TV film), as King Ottokar II of Bohemia
 (2006), as Leonhard
Mord auf Rezept (2006, TV film), as Luis Kramer
Io, Don Giovanni (2007), as Casanova
Der Kronzeuge (2007, TV film), as Achim Weber
Die Schatzinsel (2007, TV film), as Long John Silver
Du gehörst mir (2007, TV film), as Wolf
 (2007), as Martin
Midsummer Madness (2007), as Peteris
 (2008, TV film), as Thomas Dorn
 (2009, TV film), as Lawrence
Flores negras (2009), as Michael Roddick
 (2009, TV film), as Archduke John of Austria
Jew Suss: Rise and Fall (2010), as Ferdinand Marian
 (2010, TV film), as Amigo Steiger
The Weekend (2012), as Ulrich Lansky
The Decent One (2014), as Heinrich Himmler
The Dark Valley (2014), as Hans Brenner
 (2014, TV film), as Rudolf Diels
Life Eternal (2015), as Aschenbrenner
 (2015, TV film), as Luis Trenker
 (2015, TV film), as Immanuel Tauss
Brothers of the Wind (2015), as Keller
Cold Hell (2017), as Steiner
Bad Banks (2018, TV series, 6 episodes), as Quirin Sydow
 (2018), as Macheath
A Hidden Life (2019), as Vicar Ferdinand Fürthauer
 (2019), as Max Ludwig Nansen
 (2020, TV film), as Ludwig van Beethoven

Awards
Bavarian TV Awards – for Kommissar Rex (1995), Schwabenkinder (2004)
German Television Awards – for Kommissar Rex (1996), The Return of the Dancing Master (2004)
Adolf Grimme Awards, Germany – for Tanz mit dem Teufel – Die Entführung des Richard Oetker, (2002), Krambambuli (1999)
Golden Cable, Germany – for Kommissar Rex (1996)
Golden Lion Awards – for Kommissar Rex (1996)
Romy Gala, Austria – for Favorite Actor (Beliebtester Schauspieler)(2000,2001,2002,2003,2004,2005)
Italian Telegatto – for Kommissar Rex (1998)
Gertrud-Eysoldt-Ring – for König Ottokars Glück und Ende (festival in Salzburg)

External links
Tobias Moretti Official Site 

Tobias Moretti at Bernd Benjamin Media
Agentur-Setcard (pdf)

Austrian male stage actors
1959 births
Living people
Austrian people of Italian descent
Austrian male television actors
Austrian male film actors
People from Innsbruck-Land District
20th-century Austrian male actors
21st-century Austrian male actors